The European Telecommunications Standards Institute (ETSI) is an independent, not-for-profit, standardization organization in the field of information and communications. ETSI supports the development and testing of global technical standards for ICT-enabled systems, applications and services.

Overview
ETSI was set up in 1988 by the European Conference of Postal and Telecommunications Administrations (CEPT) following a proposal from the European Commission. ETSI is the officially recognized body with a responsibility for the standardization of Information and Communication Technologies (ICT). It is one of the three bodies, the others being CEN and CENELEC, officially recognized by the European Union as a European Standards Organization (ESO). The role of the European Standards Organizations is to support EU regulation and policies through the production of Harmonised European Standards and other deliverables. The standards developed by ESOs are the only ones that can be recognized as European Standards (ENs).

ETSI develops standards in key global technologies such as: GSM™, TETRA, 3G, 4G, 5G, DECT™.

ETSI’s standardization activities are organized around sectors: Home & Office, Better Living with ICT, Content Delivery, Networks, Wireless Systems, Transportation, Connecting Things, Interoperability, Public Safety and Security. Technical activities are carried out in the different ETSI technical groups (Technical Committee (TC), ETSI Project (EP), ETSI Partnership Project (EPP), Industry Specification Group (ISG), and Special Committee (SC).

The organisation is located in Sophia-Antipolis, in the south of France.

The list of all ETSI technical committees, working and industry specification groups is accessible via the ETSI Website.

Membership
ETSI has more than 900 member organizations worldwide from 65 countries and five continents. Its community is diverse and includes all the key stakeholders of the ICT sector: private companies, research entities, academia, government and public bodies as well as societal stakeholders. Small and Medium Enterprises (SMEs) and Micro-Enterprises (MEs) represent more than a quarter of ETSI's total membership .The list of current members can be found on the ETSI website.

There are different types of membership:

 Members (located in a country within the CEPT area, including local subsidiaries of global companies) and associate members (located in a country outside the CEPT area)
 Not-for-profit user associations, universities, public research bodies and Micro-Enterprises
 Governmental organizations
 Observers

Membership contributions are calculated depending on the type of membership. Members' and associate members' contributions are calculated by class which is derived from the member company's annual ECRT band.

Partnerships

ETSI works in close co-operation with the European Commission (EC) and the European Free Trade Association (EFTA). ETSI is a European Standardization Organization (ESO) and as such provides standards and specifications to support European Union (EU) legislation and public policies. ETSI also works with European country's national standards bodies or National Standards Organizations (NSO).

NSOs are responsible for the transposition of European Standards (ENs) into national standards and for the withdrawal of any conflicting national standard.

ETSI has set up a portfolio of over 100 active partnership agreements with fora, consortia and international and regional Standards Development Organisations (SDOs) located all over the world in order to improve co-operation and thus facilitate the convergence of technologies

ETSI is a founding partner of two major international partnership projects, the Third Generation Partnership Project (3GPP) for 4G and 5G mobile communication and oneM2M that produces standards for IoT communications.

All ETSI partnership agreements are available on the ETSI Member Portal.

Deliverables Types
ETSI standards are available free of charge and can be downloaded from the ETSI website. Over 1 800 standards are published annually.

They are different types of deliverables, each with its own purpose.

 European Standard (EN): to meet needs specific to Europe and for transposition into national standards, or when the document is required under a standardization request from the European Commission (EC)/European Free Trade Association (EFTA). An EN is drafted by a Technical Committee and approved by ETSI's European National Standards Organizations.
 ETSI Standard (ES): Used when the document contains normative requirements and it is necessary to submit the document to the whole ETSI membership for approval.
 ETSI Guide (EG): Used when the document contains guidance on handling of technical standardization activities, it is submitted to the whole ETSI membership for approval.
 ETSI Technical Specification (TS): Used when the document contains normative requirements and when short time-to-market, validation and maintenance are essential, it is approved by the technical committee that drafted it.
 ETSI Technical Report (TR): Used when the document contains mainly informative elements, it is approved by the technical committee that drafted it.
 Special Report (SR): Used for various purposes, including giving public availability to information not produced within a technical committee. ETSI SRs are also used for "virtual" documents, e.g. documents that are dynamically generated by a query to a database via the web. An SR is published by the technical committee in which it was produced.
 ETSI Group Specification (GS): Used by Industry Specification Groups according to the decision-making procedures defined in the group's Terms of Reference. This deliverable type is approved and adopted by the Industry Specification Group that drafted it.
 ETSI Group Report (GR): An ETSI deliverable, containing only informative elements, approved for publication by an Industry Specification Group.

Testing and Interoperability

ETSI has created a Centre for Testing and Interoperability (CTI) which mission is to provide hands-on support for testing and validation techniques to the different ETSI technical committees, 3GPP™ and oneM2M.

The CTI assists in the development of conformance and interoperability test specifications that are widely used for certification schemes.

The CTI has also been organizing interoperability events called Plugtests since 1999. Every year ETSI organizes an average of 12 Plugtests that cover diverse technologies,

These events enable networking and co-operation between companies by gathering engineers who test the interoperability of their implementations. Plugtests aim at validating ETSI standards and improving the interoperability of products and services while supporting the deployment of new technologies.

ETSI organizes other interoperability events such as Hackathons and Hackfests to further support the validation and implementation of its standards.

Research and Innovation

A significant part of ETSI’s work is to identify new potential areas for standardization at an early stage in order to monitor the technologies that may influence the future of digital economy.

To do so ETSI uses several paths to develop a close interaction between research bodies and its technical committees:

 Workshops, summits and webinars
 Close collaboration with National Standards Organizations and with SMEs that are at the edge of new technologies
 Relationships with relevant European Technology Platforms, Public Private Partnerships and Joint Technology Initiatives

Education about Standardization
ETSI has developed a comprehensive suite of educational materials on ICT standardization in collaboration with the EC and EFTA. It includes a comprehensive textbook, “Understanding ICT Standardization: Principles and Practice”, and an extensive set of over 380 slides to be used as teaching aides.

The teaching materials are targeted at third-level education, primarily for students of engineering or scientific subjects.

See Also
 EN 301 549
 Radio Equipment Directive
 List of EN standards

References

External links
ETSI Official website
ETSI Portal
3GPP website
oneM2M website
ETSI Research section
Small Business Standards (SBS) aisbl

Electrical safety standards organizations
International telecommunications
Organizations established in 1988
Standards organizations in France
Telecommunications in Europe
Telecommunications organizations